Inger Kathrine Jacobsen (5 September 1867 – 22 October 1939) was a New Zealand midwife. She was born in Tyrsted, Denmark on 5 September 1867.

References

1867 births
1939 deaths
New Zealand midwives
Danish emigrants to New Zealand
People from Horsens Municipality